Andrew Smith (born December 14, 1992) is an American-Latvian professional basketball player for BC Luleå. Smith played for the Liberty Flames team for four years as a collegiate.

College career
Smith attended Liberty University. As a senior, he averaged 9.6 points and 7.6 rebounds per game. Smith scored a career-high 21 points against Longwood on February 17, 2015. He finished his career with 737 points and 558 rebounds.

Professional career
In August 2015, Smith signed with Jūrmala of the Latvian league.

On July 18, 2016, Smith signed a 1-year contract with Donar of the Dutch Basketball League.

In July 2017, Smith signed with Rasta Vechta of the German second division ProA. With Rasta, Smith won the ProA championship and gained promotion to the Basketball Bundesliga (BBL).

On July 3, 2019, Smith was announced by Södertälje Kings for the 2019–20 season.

On November 29, 2019, Smith returned to Donar. The 2019–20 season was cancelled prematurely in March because of the COVID-19 pandemic. Smith returned to the United States. In 10 games, he recorded 9.6 points, 5.8 rebounds, 1.2 assists, 1.0 steal and 1.0 block per game. On September 10, Smith signed with Science City Jena in Germany.

On July 4, 2021, Smith signed with BC Luleå in the Sweden.

Personal
In May 2015, Smith was granted a Latvian passport in order for him to be eligible to play for the Latvian national basketball team.

References

External links
DBL Profile

1992 births
Living people
American expatriate basketball people in Germany
American expatriate basketball people in Latvia
American expatriate basketball people in the Netherlands
American men's basketball players
Basketball players from Florida
Centers (basketball)
Donar (basketball club) players
Dutch Basketball League players
Jämtland Basket players
Latvian men's basketball players
Liberty Flames basketball players
People from Pompano Beach, Florida
Power forwards (basketball)
Science City Jena players
Södertälje Kings players
Sportspeople from Broward County, Florida
American expatriate basketball people in Sweden